The 2007 Intercontinental Rally Challenge was the second season of the Intercontinental Rally Challenge. The season consisted of nine rounds and began on March 9, with the Safari Rally. The season ended on November 11 with the China Rally. Enrique García Ojeda won the title ahead of Nicolas Vouilloz and Andrea Navarra.

Calendar

Selected entries

Drivers standings
 The best seven scores from each driver count towards the championship.

Intercontinental Rally Challenge seasons
Intercontinental Rally Challenge